Premià may refer to two places in the Province of Barcelona, Catalonia, Spain:

Premià de Dalt, Maresme
Premià de Mar, Maresme

See also
Premia, comune in the Province of Verbano-Cusio-Ossola, Piedmont, Italy